The Nukunonu Church is a religious building affiliated with the Catholic Church that is in the atoll of Nukunonu in Tokelau, a dependent territory of New Zealand in the Pacific Ocean. It is the main Catholic church in Tokelau, the other being in Fakaofo atoll.

The church is under the jurisdiction of the Mission sui iuris of Tokelau (Missio sui iuris Tokelauna) and follows the Roman or Latin rite. It is under the pastoral responsibility of the priest Oliver P. Aro.

References

Roman Catholic churches in Tokelau
Roman Catholic churches completed in 1941
Nukunonu
20th-century Roman Catholic church buildings in New Zealand